Dembski (feminine: Dembska; plural: Dembscy) is a Polish-language surname. It is a variant of Dębski. The surname may refer to:
 Paweł Dembski, 16th-century Polish churchman
 William A. Dembski (born 1960), American mathematician, philosopher and theologian
 Yevheniya Dembska (1920–2019), theatre and cinema actress

See also 
 Dębski
 Demski

Polish-language surnames